The Grand Prix Union Dortmund was a German cycling race organized for the last time in 1984.

The course was between 130 and 172 km, with Dortmund as both start and finish place.

The competition's roll of honor includes the successes of Eddy Merckx, Hennie Kuiper and Patrick Sercu. Merckx won two editions and finished two times as third.

Only two German riders, Rudi Altig and Dietrich Thurau, managed to win the race. For a few years, a parallel race for amateurs was also organized.

Winners

References 

Cycle races in Germany
1962 establishments in Germany
Defunct cycling races in Germany
Recurring sporting events established in 1962
Recurring sporting events disestablished in 1984
1984 disestablishments in Germany